Fletchers Land, sometimes written as Fletcher's Land, is a neighborhood in downtown Kingston, Jamaica. The area, served by the Central Kingston Police Division, has a reputation for being dangerous. The no longer active Land Raiders Gang emerged in Fletchers Land.

Notable people
 Reggae artist Linval "Ashaka" Thomas is from Fletchers Land.

References

Neighbourhoods in Kingston, Jamaica